Hemerocallis middendorffii, known as Amur daylily, is a plant species in the subfamily Hemerocallidoideae of the family Asphodelaceae of the order Asparagales. It is native to the Russian Far East, northwest China, Korea, and Japan. It grows in meadows, mountain slopes, open woods, and scrub. It is cultivated in Asia for its edible flowers.

Description
Flower scapes . Flowers 5–6, golden yellow to clear orange, large in a terminal head. Flowers in July for 2–3 weeks and often reblooms in September.

Four varieties are recognized:
H. middendorffii var. middendorfii: To . Flowers orange, odorless with elliptic to spathulate tepals. Bracts ovate, . The range of the species.
H. middendorffii var. esculenta (Koidz.) Ohwi: Japan
H. middendorffii var. exaltata (Stout) M.Hotta: Japan
H. middendorffii var. longibracteata Xiong: . Flowers yellow, fragrant with lanceolate tepals. Bracts ovate-lanceolate, . Endemic to China.

Cultivation
Easily cultivated on moist soil in a sunny site, but can tolerate poor soil and partial shade. Propagated by division and by seed. Takes 2–3 years to flower from seed.

Plants prefer a neutral to slightly acid soil and will suffer in very acid or alkaline soils. Generally free from pests and diseases. Hardy to USDA zone 4.

References

middendorffii
Flora of Eastern Asia
Flora of Manchuria
Flora of the Russian Far East
Garden plants
Tubers
Edible plants